US Montauban is a French rugby union club that currently competes in Rugby Pro D2, the second level of the country's professional league system. They have also competed at the top level, Top 14, in the past, most recently between 2007 and 2010. The club is based in Montauban in the département of Tarn-et-Garonne in Occitania.

In April 2010, it was announced the club would be relegated from the Top 14 to the Rugby Pro D2 at the end of the 2009/2010 season after breaking budget rules for the league. Although the club appealed the ruling it started to release players to reduce its budget. The club was not in the relegation zone at the time, thereby saving CS Bourgoin-Jallieu, Aviron Bayonnais and Montpellier Hérault RC a nervous run in as they were in the relegation battle with Montauban. On the 26 April 2010, the club filed for bankruptcy at a commercial court following a meeting of the club's board of directors.

On 24 May 2014, it was announced that they had won promotion back to Pro D2 for the 2014–15 season as a result of winning the Fédérale 1 semi-final 35 – 12 against Lille Métropole Rugby. They went on to win the Fédérale 1 title, defeating Massy 18–14 in the final.

History
The club was established in 1903. The club made its first championship appearance in the 1967 season, when it captured its first championship title, defeating CA Bègles 11 points to 3 in Bordeaux. It gained promotion from Pro D2 for the 2006–07 season.

In its first match of the 2006-07 season, Montauban defeated Narbonne 41–20, gaining five points (including a bonus point) to go to second in the table after round one. The team continued in surprisingly strong form for a newly promoted team, notably handing early runaway league leaders Stade Français their first defeat of the season, 15–9, in Round 10 on 6 October. Montauban ended the season in seventh place, a respectable position for a newly promoted team. The 2007-08 season saw it consolidate its Top 14 position, again finishing seventh. Because Toulouse advanced to the final of that year's Heineken Cup, which was farther than any team from England or Italy, Montauban was given a place in the 2008-09 Heineken Cup, pooled with champions Munster.

Current standings

Current squad

The Montauban squad for the 2022–23 season is:

Espoirs squad

Honours
 French championship:
 Champions: 1967
 Rugby Pro D2:
 Champions:  2001, 2006
 Fédérale 1
 Champions (Trophée Jean-Prat): 2014
 Challenge de l'Espérance:
 Champions: 1967
 Challenge Antoine Béguère:
 Champions: 1971
 Challenge Armand Vaquerin:
 Champions: 2005
 Runners-up: 2004

Finals results

French championship

Trophée Jean-Prat

References

 USM Rugby - 100 photos pour un centenaire, 2003

External links
  Official site

Montauban
Sport in Tarn-et-Garonne
1903 establishments in France
Rugby clubs established in 1903